Innocenzo Ferrieri (1810–1887) was an Italian cardinal of the Roman Catholic Church. Ferrieri was appointed Titular Archbishop of Side on 4 October 1847. He was elevated to Cardinal on 13 March 1868 by Pope Pius IX and appointed Cardinal-Priest of the Cardinal Titular Church of Santa Cecilia on 24 September 1868.

References

1810 births
1887 deaths
Diplomats of the Holy See
19th-century Italian cardinals
Cardinals created by Pope Pius IX